Ted Johns is a Canadian playwright, born in Seaforth, Ontario in 1942. His plays have been primarily produced at the Blyth Festival but also at Theatre New Brunswick, Theatre Passe Muraille, and the Upper Canada Playhouse.

Plays
Naked on the North Shore, 1974
He Won't Come in From the Barn, 1977
The School Show, 1978
The Death of the Donnellys, 1979
St. Sam and the Nukes, 1980
Country Hearts, 1982
Garrison's Garage, 1984
Hands of Healing, 1987
Two Brothers, 1991
Back Up and Push, 1992

References

1942 births
Living people
20th-century Canadian dramatists and playwrights
Writers from Ontario
People from Huron County, Ontario
Canadian male dramatists and playwrights
20th-century Canadian male writers